Takis Tsiakos (1909–1997) was a Greek poet, representative of the poetic style of Kostis Palamas.

Tsiakos was born in Gjirokastër, Janina Vilayet, Ottoman Empire, present-day southern Albania. In 1930 he moved to Ioannina, Greece, where he made his literary appearance writing lyrics in columns of local newspapers as well as in widely known Greek magazines. In 1936 he published his first collection named 'Extinguished echo'. His work was influenced by the national character of Kostis Palamas' poetry, something that was commonly found among the Greek poets from the Greek minority in Albania. Takis Tsiakos later became the vice president of the Board of the Association of Greek Litterateurs.

Poetry collections
Takis Tsiakos published the following poetry collections:

1936: Extinct Echoes (Σβησμένη Ηχώ)1945: Beaches and reefs (Αμμουδιές και Βατραχάκια)1949: Limpets (Πεταλίδες)1956: Noon.1976: Strolls and Returns.

His works have been translated in several languages.

References

1909 births
1997 deaths
People from Gjirokastër
People from Janina vilayet
20th-century Greek poets
Greek male poets
Date of birth missing
Date of death missing
20th-century Greek male writers
Albanian emigrants to Greece